Argenton-Notre-Dame is a former commune in the Mayenne department in northwestern France with a population of 215 (2018). On 1 January 2019, it was merged into the new commune Bierné-les-Villages.

Population

See also
Communes of Mayenne

References

Former communes of Mayenne